Green Holm is the name of several islands.

Orkney
 Muckle Green Holm off Eday
 Little Green Holm beside the former

Shetland
 Green Holm, (HU382379), is a small uninhabited island 0.5 km north of Burra Ness
 Green Holm, Gletness, in the Isles of Gletness off south east, Mainland, Shetland (also a "Green Isle" in this group)
 Green Holm, Vementry off Vementry

See also
 Gruney (disambiguation)
 Grunay
 Green Island (disambiguation)
 Green Isle (disambiguation)
 Greena

Scottish Island set index articles